Pseudechiniscus jiroveci is a species of tardigrade within the family Echiniscidae, originally described from 5 juvenile specimens. The species is found in China, with some occurrences recorded from Tanzania and the Republic of South Africa.

References 

Animals described in 1963
Fauna of China
Fauna of Tanzania
Fauna of South Africa
Echiniscidae